Thaumatoncus is a genus of sheet weavers that was first described by Eugène Louis Simon in 1884.

Species
 it contains two species.
Thaumatoncus indicator Simon, 1884 – Spain, France, Algeria, Tunisia
Thaumatoncus secundus Bosmans, 2002 – Algeria, Israel

See also
 List of Linyphiidae species (Q–Z)

References

Araneomorphae genera
Linyphiidae
Spiders of Africa
Spiders of Asia